Rita Vidaurri (May 22, 1924 – January 16, 2019) was a Tejana singer from San Antonio, Texas, who worked with Nat King Cole, Pedro Infante, Jorge Negrete and Eva Garza.

Biography
Gifted with a powerful voice from a musical family, Vidaurri had to hide her gift from her saloon-owning father. As a pre-teen, her mother would take her to a local amateur singing contest in San Antonio, where she won the five-dollar first prize 18 weeks in a row. Vidaurri was only 14 when her mother died. At the time, she would perform in one of her father's saloons with her sister as "Las Hermanas Vidaurri."

References

1924 births
2019 deaths
Place of death missing
Musicians from San Antonio
American women singers
Tejano musicians
21st-century American women